Black Widow is an album by Argentine composer, pianist and conductor Lalo Schifrin recorded in 1976 and released on the CTI label.

Reception
The Allmusic review called it "one of the peak albums in Lalo Schifrin's lengthy catalogue and a necessity for anyone interested in his jazz work".

Track listing
All compositions by Lalo Schifrin except as indicated
 "Black Widow" - 4:11 
 "Flamingo" (Edmund Anderson, Ted Grouya) - 4:31 
 "Quiet Village" (Les Baxter) - 5:45 
 "Moonglow/Theme from Picnic" (Will Hudson, Irving Mills, Eddie DeLange/George Duning, Steve Allen) - 6:13 
 "Jaws" (John Williams) - 6:01 
 "Baia" (Ary Barroso, Ray Gilbert) - 4:49 
 "Turning Point" - 3:29 
 "Dragonfly" - 5:45 
 "Frenesi" (Alberto Dominguez) - 3:53 Bonus track on CD reissue 
 "Tabú" (Margarita Lecuona) - 4:33 Bonus track on CD reissue
 "Baia" (Barroso, Gilbert) - 7:44 Bonus track on CD reissue 
 "Con Alma" - 6:30 Bonus track on CD reissue 
Recorded at Mediasound Studios in New York City on March 29 & 30, 1976

Personnel
Lalo Schifrin - piano, keyboards, arranger, conductor
Jon Faddis - trumpet
Wayne Andre, Billy Campbell, Barry Rogers - trombone
Dave Taylor - bass trombone
Pepper Adams - baritone saxophone
Joe Farrell - alto saxophone, flute
Jerry Dodgion, Hubert Laws, George Marge - flute
Clark Spangler - keyboards
Eric Gale, Jerry Friedman, John Tropea - guitar
Anthony Jackson - bass
Andy Newmark - drums
Don Alias, Carter Collins, Sue Evans, Carlos Martin - percussion
Patti Austin - vocals
Max Ellen, Paul Gershman, Emanuel Green, Harold Kohon, Charles Libove, Harry Lookofsky, David Nadien, Matthew Raimondi - violin

References

CTI Records albums
Lalo Schifrin albums
1976 albums
Albums produced by Creed Taylor
Albums arranged by Lalo Schifrin